Stephen Cusack may refer to:

 Stephen A. Cusack, British molecular biologist
 Steve Cusack (1876–1952), American Major League Baseball umpire